NGC 3844 is a lenticular galaxy located about 320 million light-years away in the constellation Leo. The galaxy was discovered by astronomer Heinrich d'Arrest on May 8, 1864. NGC 3844 is a member of the Leo Cluster and is likely to be a low-luminosity AGN (LLAGN).

See also
 List of NGC objects (3001–4000)

References

External links

3844
36481
Leo (constellation)
Leo Cluster
Lenticular galaxies
Astronomical objects discovered in 1864
6705
Active galaxies